Crestwood station is a commuter rail stop on the Metro-North Railroad's Harlem Line, serving the communities of Tuckahoe, Yonkers, and Eastchester, New York. Because of its location at the northern end of the triple-track segment of the Harlem Line, Crestwood is often the first/last stop outside New York City on Harlem Line express trains, and its center island platform is frequently used to short turn local trains during rush hour.

The Harlem Line has two stations in the village of Tuckahoe. Tuckahoe station, the next station heading southbound, is located near Tuckahoe Village Hall, while Crestwood is located near the adjoining residential neighborhood of Crestwood, Yonkers.

As of August 2006, daily commuter ridership was 1,596, and there are 283 parking spots.

History
Originally built by the New York Central Railroad sometime in 1901, the station's canopy was rebuilt in 1911, then faced a major redesign in 1928. The Crestwood railroad station is depicted in the painting "Commuter" by Norman Rockwell and was featured on the cover of the November 16, 1946 edition of the Saturday Evening Post.  In Norman Rockwell's depiction, you can see commuters approaching from the Crestwood side of the station. As with the rest of the Harlem Line, the merger of New York Central with Pennsylvania Railroad in 1968 transformed it into a Penn Central station, which received platform extensions in 1971.

Penn Central commuter service was gradually merged with the Metropolitan Transportation Authority (MTA), and officially became part of Metro-North in 1983. In the Spring of 1989, the platforms were reconstructed again, along with those of Fleetwood, Bronxville, and Tuckahoe stations. Under the 2015–2019 MTA Capital Plan, the station, along with four other Metro-North Railroad stations, would receive a complete overhaul as part of the Enhanced Station Initiative. Updates would include cellular service, Wi-Fi, USB charging stations, interactive service advisories, and maps. The renovations at Crestwood station will cost $10.6 million and will be completed by the end of October 2019.

Station layout
The station has two slightly offset high-level platforms each 12 cars long. Parking at the station is available on Columbus Avenue halfway between Fisher Avenue and Lincoln Avenue along the northbound platforms, and off of the Thompson Street interchange of the Bronx River Parkway along the southbound platforms.

References

External links

 Crestwood Metro-North station (TheSubwayNut)
 Columbus Avenue entrance from Google Maps Street View
 April 26, 1964 NYC Harlem Division Timetable including Crestwood (Eastchester) Station

Metro-North Railroad stations in New York (state)
Former New York Central Railroad stations
Railway stations in Westchester County, New York
Railway stations in the United States opened in 1901
Tuckahoe, Westchester County, New York
1901 establishments in New York (state)
Transportation in Westchester County, New York